Coxford Priory or Broomsthorpe Priory was a monastic house in Norfolk, England.

An Augustinian Canons Regular establishment, initially founded around 1140 at the church of St Mary, East Rudham by William Cheney, the community was transferred to a new site at Coxford c.1216. The building there was constructed of 
flint with stone dressings and is now a grade II* listed ruin.

The priory was dissolved in 1536.

See also
List of monastic houses in Norfolk
List of monastic houses in England

References

Monasteries in Norfolk
Augustinian monasteries in England
1140s establishments in England
Christian monasteries established in the 12th century
1536 disestablishments in England
Grade II* listed buildings in Norfolk
Grade II* listed monasteries
Grade II* listed ruins
Church ruins in England